The 2022–23 National T20 Cup (also known as Kingdom Valley National T20 Cup 2022-23, for sponsorship reasons) was a Twenty20 domestic cricket competition played in Pakistan. It was the nineteenth season of the National T20 Cup, with the tournament starting from 30 August 2022 and final played on 19 September 2022. In August 2022, the Pakistan Cricket Board (PCB) confirmed the fixtures of the tournament. Khyber Pakhtunkhwa are the defending champions.

Background
In August 2022, the Pakistani government announced the return of departmental cricket from the 2023 season, meaning this edition is likely to be the last to be carried out in the current format.

Squads 
On 25 August 2022, the PCB confirmed all the squads for the tournament.

Venues 
The tournament took place at Multan and Rawalpindi.

Points table

Fixtures

Round-robin

Finals

Awards

End of the season awards 

Source:

References

2022 in Pakistani cricket
Domestic cricket competitions in 2022–23
Pakistani cricket seasons from 2000–01
2022–23 National T20 Cup